Trouble With X is the second and final album by American Christian ska band The W's. Some copies include "The Rumor Weed Song" as a bonus track. The song originally appeared during the credits of the VeggieTales episode Larry-Boy! & the Rumor Weed.

Five Iron Frenzy member Dennis Culp played trombone and managed horn arrangements extensively on the album.

Track listing
 "Rather Be Dead"
 "Saturday"
 "Bully Go Home"
 "Country Roads"
 "Hit 'Em Where It Hurts"
 "Play the Game"
 "Stupid"
 "Tip From Me"
 "Where Should I Go"
 "Used Car Salesman"
 "Nothing"
 "101"
 "Chump"
 "Two More Weeks"
 "The Rumor Weed Song" (from VeggieTales: LarryBoy and the Rumor Weed)

Music credits
Andrew Schar – Lead Vocals, Guitar, banjo on "Rather Be Dead," "Hit 'Em Where It Hurts"
Brian Morris – Drums, Cover Art Talent
Valentine Hellman – Tenor Sax, Clarinet
Bret Barker – Trumpet
Todd Gruener – Bass, vocals
James Carter – Alto Sax, background vocals

Additional musicians
Dennis Culp – Trombone on "Rather Be Dead," "Bully Go Home," "Stupid," "Nothing," "The Rumor Weed Song"; horn arrangements on "Rather Be Dead," "Hit 'Em Where It Hurts," "Stupid," "The Rumor Weed Song"
Masaki Liu – Clarinet arrangement on "Rather Be Dead," "Play the Game"; horn arrangements on "Saturday," "Bully Go Home," "Country Roads," "Play the Game," "Tip From Me," "The Rumor Weed Song"; guitar on "Country Roads"
Richard Howarter – whistler on "Hit 'Em Where It Hurts"
Kurt Heinecke – Music and horn arrangements on "The Rumor Weed Song"
Background vocals on "Country Roads:" Tyson, Jamie, Amber, Mindy, Thea, Sooz, Bethany, Kelly, Lori
"Country Roads" was written by John Denver, Bill Danoff, and Taffy Nivert-Danoff
"The Rumor Weed Song" – words and music by Phil Vischer
"Stupid" – words and music by Dennis Culp

Production credits
Produced by Masaki
Executive Produced by Frank Tate
Album design and Layout by Aaron James
Photography by Melinda DiMauro

References

1999 albums
The W's albums